The Roman Catholic Archdiocese of San Fernando (Kapampangan: Arkidiosesis ning San Fernando) is the archdiocese of the Latin Church of the Catholic Church in Pampanga, Philippines which has territorial jurisdiction over the whole province of Pampanga and Angeles City. The archdiocese is also the metropolitan see of the ecclesiastical province of the same name, which also include three dioceses of its surrounding provinces of Bataan (Diocese of Balanga), Zambales (Diocese of Iba), and Tarlac (Diocese of Tarlac). The cathedral church and seat of the archdiocese is the Metropolitan Cathedral of San Fernando (Pampanga). The Virgin Mary, under the title Virgen de los Remedios, is the principal patroness.

Its suffragan dioceses of Balanga, Iba, and Tarlac, along with the dioceses of San Jose and Cabanatuan in Nueva Ecija (both suffragans of Archdiocese of Lingayen-Dagupan), and Malolos in Bulacan (suffragan of the Archdiocese of Manila), form the group of dioceses in Central Luzon.

Florentino G. Lavarias, D.D., is the current archbishop of the archdiocese since October 27, 2014, succeeding Paciano B. Aniceto, D.D. who resigned three months earlier on July 25, 2014.

History

From diocese to archdiocese

The diocese of San Fernando, Pampanga was created on December 11, 1948, through the Apostolic Constitution  Probe Noscitur; it comprised the provinces of Pampanga, Bataan, Zambales, parts of Tarlac, and Nueva Ecija. It was initially a suffragan of the Archdiocese of Manila. The first bishop was César María Guerrero, DD, a native of Manila; he received his appointment from the Vatican on May 29, 1949, and was installed on September 8 of the same year. The parish of Our Lady of the Assumption, in the provincial capital town of San Fernando, was selected as the seat of the new diocese; the parish church was thus elevated into a cathedral and was renamed Cathedral of Our Lady of the Assumption.

Bishop Guerrero established the Mater Boni Consilii (now Mother of Good Counsel) Seminary in 1950 (it was originally in Guagua, then Apalit, before being relocated to its present site in San Fernando): the Cruzada de Penitencia y Caridad (or devotion to the Virgen delos Remedios) in 1952, which continues to this day; and Carmelite Monastery in Angeles in 1956, where on March 14, 1957, he retired due to poor health. He died on March 27, 1961, and was buried beside the monastery chapel, according to his wishes.

Eventually the diocese was dismembered when provincial boundaries became more pronounced.   Zambales was established as a prelature on October 18, 1955, Nueva Ecija as a diocese on February 16, 1963, Tarlac as a diocese on May 10, 1963, and Bataan as a diocese on March 17, 1975.

Emilio A. Cinense, DD, a native of Guimba, Nueva Ecija, became the second bishop of San Fernando on March 15, 1957.  It was during this term that the Diocese of San Fernando was elevated to a Metropolitan See and Archdiocese; the canonical election was held on June 15, 1975.  The new archdiocese comprised the whole province of Pampanga with three suffragan dioceses: Tarlac, Iba (Zambales) and Balanga (Bataan).

After the death of Archbishop Cinense, Oscar C. Cruz, DD, the native of Balanga, Bataan, and at the time rector of San Carlos Seminary, was appointed second Archbishop of San Fernando on May 22, 1978; he resigned on October 24, 1988.  On January 31, 1989, Paciano B. Aniceto of Sta. Ana, Pampanga, former rector of the Mother of Good Counsel Seminary and Bishop of Iba, was appointed third (and first Pampanga-born) Archbishop of San Fernando; he was formally installed on March 14, 1989.

On December 11, 1998, the Golden Jubilee anniversary of its creation as a diocese  the Archdiocese of San Fernando's Cathedral of the Assumption was consecrated and rededicated as The Metropolitan Cathedral of San Fernando, during ceremonies presided over by the papal nuncio, Antonio Franco, DD.

Pampanga: first and last Augustinian territory in Luzon
 
Pampanga was not only the pioneer and premiere territory of the Augustinian Order in Luzon but also the last bastion of their evangelical ministry.  They administered Pampanga throughout the 300-year. Spanish colonial period (with a few interruptions) and way beyond it, from 1572 all the way to 1960 when they ceded their last parish to local diocesan clergy (although the last Augustinian priest working in the Kapampangan Region died only as recently as 1993). Here's a brief description of the twenty mission stations (now parishes) founded by the Augustinians in Pampanga; many existed as communities before the Spaniards came.

LUBAO (1572): Maestre de Campo Martin helped P. Fray Gallagos found Lubao in 1572. In 1580 a school of Latin and humanities was established for the inhabitants and missionaries from Spain and Mexico. The first Augustinian printing press in the country was located in this town. Fray Antonio Herrera built the church, the largest in Pampanga.

BETIS (1572): Also founded in 1572 by Fray Fernando Pinto. Although the Libro lists P. Fray Mateo Peralta as its first parroco, P. Fray Jose de la Cruz built the stone church. Early friars describe the faithful of Betis as the most pious and industrious people in the whole province; also, Betis is said to have produced the largest number of priests in the entire country.

MACABEBE (1575): P. Sebastian Molina was Macabebe's first pastor. Equally prominent friars – PP. Montoya, Tallada, Coronel, Medina, and the illustrious Foronda, all writers in Pampango – later followed him. The first Pampango book ever published, Vida de san Nicolas do tolentino ( 1614), was written by Fray Tallada when he was minister of this town.

CANDABA (1575): P. Fray Manrique was the pioneer missionary of Candava (Candaba), also founded in 1575. P. Fray Jose de la Cruz, who built the churches of Betis and Mexico, built its stone church only in 1665, P. Fray Estaban Ibeas built its cimborrio (dome), and P. Fray Bravo the tower. The convent was built by the early fathers and later embellished by Fathers Ferrer, Ibeas and Bernando.

BACOLOR (1576): P. Fray Diego Ochoa, author of the first Arte, Vocabulario y Confesionario en Pampango, founded Bacolor. The church is said to be the most beautiful in the province, featuring a grand transept, a project of PP. Fray Manuel Diaz, E. Alvarez and Antonio Bravo, and boasts of having the biggest convent in the whole province. It also has a spacious cemetery equipped with a fine chapel.

MEXICO (1581): The town was initially called Nuevo Mexico, with Fr. Bernardino de Quevedo and Fr. Pedro de Abuyoas first priors. The first church, built by P. Fray Jose de la Cruz in 1665, was destroyed by the great earthquake of 1880, leaving intact the bell tower. Fr. Esteban D. Ibeas had a provisional structure of wood and iron built. The construction of the permanent church, which Fr. Ibeas had planned, was never realized because he was recalled to Manila, and eventually died of cancer of the tongue.

ARAYAT (1590): Among the friars assigned to this town were Fathers Contreras, Ven. Bedoya, Ortiz, and Ossorio who built its beautiful church of cut stone and bricks. Fathers Jose Torres and Juan Tarrero later rebuilt it from 1858 to 1892. Arayat owes to Fr. Torres the construction of a beautiful baño (bath house) at the foot of the mountain about two kilometres from the town proper, which is now still a popular destination.

GUAGUA (1590): Fr. Bernardo de Quevedo founded the Guagua mission in 1590 with Fr. Juan de Zabala as first resident priest. One Augustinian wrote that “Guagua occupies the second place among the convents of Pampanga, just after that of Bacolor, although formerly it was number one.” One reason for Guagua's progress was the existence of Parian, an area where natives mixed with Chinese merchants in marriage and in business. Originally these Chinese were refugees from persecution by Gen. Simon de Anda, who had accused them of conniving with the British invaders in 1762 and plotting to assassinate the Governor General and some Augustinians. Another Augustinian likened the Holy Week processions in Guagua as comparable to those held in Spain.

SASMUAN (1590): Sexmoan (Sasmuan) visited Guagua in 1590 and Lubao in 1611. In 1613 its residents complained of the inconvenience of having to go to Lubao for Mass, confession and catechism. In 1615, Fr. Pedro de Zuñiga was appointed vicar of Sexmoan. Fr. Jose Duque built the first church. Chronicler Fray Gaspar de San Agustin wrote; “The church is very beautiful, and it is placed under the advocation of Santa Lucia; the convent is of first class too”. Both buildings were swept away by the overflowing river beside them. In 1884, Fr. Toribio Fanjul restored the church.

PORAC (1594): Fr. Mateo de Peralta founded Porac in 1954 by organizing the Negritoes from various rancherias into a single town. In 1607, Porac was annexed to Bacolor as a visit; in 1641, the convent was relieved of its obligation to pay rent to Manila, due to extreme poverty. Fathers Manuel Obregon (1726) and Nicolas Mornier (1735) are credited to have constructed the church, which was destroyed by an earthquake in 1863 and restored by Frs. Isidoro Fernando and Esteban Ibeas (while stationed at Sta. Rita). Damaged again in World War II, it was restored by Fr. Daniel Castrillo, the last Augustinian parish priest of Pampanga.

APALIT (1597): The first prior was Fr. Pedro de Vergara, but it was Fr. Juan Cabello that started the construction of the first church constructed by Fr. Antonio Redondo in 1876–83. It cost P40,000 but Fr. Redondo spent only P 30, 000 through good fiscal management. It is said that the sacristan would go around town ringing a bell, preceded by the brass band, and the townspeople would follow him with their donations of sand and other materials: “The whole town of Apalit helped either with monetary donations, personal service or their good wishes."

MAGALANG (1605): Fr. Gonzalo de Salazar served as first prior in 1605 in the town's original site at barrio Macapsa. It was transferred to San Bartolome, which was abandoned due to flood in 1856, prompting another transfer to its present site in barrio Talimunduc. Fr. Ramon Sarrionandia supervised the transfer and gave the town its name, San Pedro de Magalang. The first church, built in 1725 in San Bartolome, was destroyed in the flood; the present church was built by Fr. Sarrionandia in 1886.

MINALIN (1614): Minalin was segregated from its matrix Macabebe in 1614; Fr. Miguel de Saldaña served as the first prior only in 1618. No records exist on when the church was constructed and by whom; only one record states it was finished in 1834. Augustinian figures as well as what appears to be a map of the town marked 1619 are found in the convent, although it is unlikely the map was painted in that year.

MABALACAT (1712): This town was formerly a mission of the Augustinians. Due to some insurmountable difficulties it was abandoned and later given to the Augustinian Recollects in 1712. Fr. Andres de San Fulgencio is one of the three friars who pioneered the mission. This was the famous bamboo organ builder Fr. Diego Cera's first assignment after his ordination in Spain. It was turned over to the secular priests in 1898.

SANTA RITA (1726): Fr. Pedro de San Nicolas served as minister of both Porac and Sta. Rita in 1722, but it was only in 1726 when Sta. Rita had its own priest and therefore became an independent parish. Fr. Francisco Royo built the present church in 1839; Fr. Juan Merino completed it in 1868. These two priests also opened the road linking Sta. Rita with Porac and Guagua. During the Revolution, the townspeople hid their last Augustinian parish priest, Fr. Celestino Garcia, in their houses until the forces of Gen. Maximino Hizon captured him in Bacolor and took him all the way to Lepanto in the Cordilleras.

SAN LUIS (1740): Formerly known as San Nicolas de Cabagsa, in honor of former parish priest Fr. Nicolas de Orduño (cabagsac means a place where fruit bags are bagged out), the town had Fr. Jose Echevarria as first prior in 1742. There is no data on who built the church or when, except that Fr. Isidro Bernardo made great restorations in 1883.

SAN FERNANDO (1754): San Fernando had its first prior, Fr. Sebastian Moreno, only two years after its foundation in 1754. He also started the construction of the church; Fr. Mariano Alafont completed it in 1761. Destroyed in 1828, it was restored by Fr. Pedro Medina and Fr. Antonio Redondo, who had paintings done on the ceiling and the majestic dome built. It was destroyed again in 1899 by Antonio Luna's soldiers, rebuilt, and then burned down in 1939. Architect Fernando Ocampo designed it after the war.

SANTA ANA (1756): As early as 1598, the town (formerly named Pimpin) functioned as visita of Arayat, and it was in 1756 that Augustinians declared it an independent parish with Fr. Lorenzo Guerra as first prior. The church was built in 1853; Fr. Lucas Gonzales added the five-story belfry in 1857. The stones used came from Meycauayan and the wood from Porac and Betis.

SAN SIMON (1771): The town's original name was Virgen del Pilar, after its founder Mariano del Pilar de los Reyes. After the British Occupation of 1762–65, Gen. Simon de Anda renamed it San Simon after his namesake. The Augustinians appointed the first prior only in 1771, Fr. Fernando Medalla. In 1870, Fr. Benito Ubierna built the first church; the revolutionaries burned it down in 1898.

STO. TOMAS (1793): Formerly called Baliuag, Sto. Tomas parish was founded in 1763, by secular priests, although by 1853 the Augustinians had reclaimed it. The church was built by secular priests and later repaired by Fray Guillermo Masnou. The convent was built later by Fray Tarrero and Fray Bedoya.

ANGELES (1820): The former barrio of San Fernando became a separate town in 1829. Initially ministered by a secular priest, Angeles (formerly Culiat) got its first Augustinian prior, Fr. Vicente Andres, in 1843.  Fr. Guillermo Masnou built a wooden church in 1855 to replace the first nipa church, while Fr. Ramon Sarrionandia started the construction in 1860 of the present stone edifice. Fr. Rufino Santos (not the cardinal) did some restoration work in 1893. It took 37 years to complete the church in 1897.

FLORIDABLANCA (1867): Formerly a hacienda of Lubao called San Jose de Calumpaui, the town was renamed Floridablanca after the Count of Floridablanca, Spain (Don Jose Monino), who reportedly owned vast tracts of land in the town.  Fr. Jose Hernandez served as the first prior after the town became a parish in 1867, the same year Calumpaui became Floridablanca.  Fr. Luciano Morron Ylla constructed the church and convent in 1887.  The parish was under the Augustinians until 1960.

MASANTOL (1887): The town, formerly a barrio of Macabebe, was founded in 1887—probably the last one founded by the Augustinians in Pampanga.  It became an independent parish with the name San Miguel de Masantol in 1894.

Coat of arms
Upon the green terrain rises the lone and majestic Mount Arayat on a red background surmounted by the sword and crown of Saint Ferdinand the King. The rose at base is symbol of Our Lady invoked under her titles as Our Lady of the Assumption (titular of the cathedral) and Our Lady of Remedies (Nuestra Señora de los Remedios).

Prelates of the See

Ordinary before the Elevation to a Metropolitan See

Archbishops

Auxiliary Bishops
1972-1975: + Celso N. Guevarra, D.D. - Appointed Bishop of Balanga on  4 June 1975 
1987-1991: + Jesus C. Galang, D.D. - Appointed Bishop of Urdaneta on  7 December 1991 
2006–2012: Most. Rev. Roberto C. Mallari, D.D. - Appointed Bishop of San Jose on 15 May 2012 
2006–2015: Most. Rev. Pablo Virgilio S. David, D.D. - Appointed Bishop of Kalookan on 14 October 2015

Other Priests of the Archdiocese who became Bishops

 Honesto Flores Ongtioco, 2nd Bishop of the Diocese of Balanga (June 18, 1998–August 28, 2003 and 1st Bishop of the Diocese of Cubao (August 28, 2003–present). 
 Victor C. Ocampo, 4th Bishop of the Diocese of Gumaca (June 12, 2015–present).

Timeline of bishops

Archbishops

The Crusade of the Virgen De Los Remedios & Sto. Cristo Del Perdon y Caridad
True to form, Kapampangans make a big fuss over appearances, and don't quite know how to solve the problem of two images of the same Virgen—the officially crowned replica and the sidelined antique original. The crusade, in which the image of Our Lady of Remedies (Virgen de los Remedios) is taken in daily processions all over Pampanga 365 days a year, is tradition that can be found only in this province of Pampanga. Today, however, the original purpose of the crusade—and the Virgin—have long since been forgotten, the fact that the crusade was established to help in the battle against the Communist Hukbalahap in the province in the 1950s.

On one hand, the original image stays in its original chapel in Baliti, San Fernando City; on the other hand, three replicas have been made to serve as symbols of the crusade. The Baliti faithful recently began actively promoting its shrine as a pilgrimage site, a la Our Lady of Manaoag in Pangasinan. However, for the rest of Pampanga, devotion is mostly directed to the most visible and accessible two pilgrim images which are replicas of the replica; these two images are carried in procession non-stop even to the farthest fishing villages and mountain hamlets. However, the biggest crowds gather (albeit once a year only) around the first replica of the original image, taken out once a year (from the Archdiocesan Chancery) for the annual coronation rites (alternately in San Fernando and Angeles). Thus, there are four identical images of same Virgen de los Remedios: one stationery image in Baliti, another that is kept in the Chancery, taken out only every September 8; and the two pilgrim images constantly going around the province for the crusade. In these processions, the image of the Santo Cristo de Perdon accompanies the Virgen—underscoring the belief of Catholics that the Blessed Virgin helps bring Christ even to the most unreachable people.

Beginning of the devotions 

This all began when the Diocese of San Fernando was created on December 11, 1948, as a separate diocese away from the Archdiocese of Manila. Its first bishop was the Cesar Ma. Guerrero, DD, who immediately identified the most pressing problem of Pampanga as the peasant uprising against the feudal system, fueled by a communist ideology. Socialist mayors were being elected, including those in Angeles and San Fernando; the sonorous sound of the tambuli was a nightly occurrence, and so were parades of peasants waving red flags. The people did go to Mass and pray the Angelus and the rosary, but as Bishop Guerrero said, “Aqui en Pampanga hay mucha piedad, pero poca caridad!” (“Here in Pampanga there is much piety, but little charity!”) in the vernacular: “Deng Kapampangan, mapangadi la, pero ali la mapamie!”

After much prayer and reflection, to counteract Communist support among the farmers of Pampanga, Bishop Guerrero established the Cruzada ning Pamanisi at Lugud (Crusade of Penance and Charity), during a meeting held on the third Sunday of February 1952 at the San Guillermo Parish in Bacolor, Pampanga. He appointed the parish's co-adjutor Fr. Diosdado Victorio as director of the Cruzada, who chose the image of the Lady of Remedies (Virgen de los Remedios), then enshrined in the Virgen de los Remedios Parish (not San Roque parish as previously thought) in Brgy. Baliti, San Fernando, Pampanga, as the image that would accompany the Cruzada across the province. It may be deduced that Bishop Guerrero's choice of patron saint may have been influenced by his personal devotion to Virgen de los Remedios, patron saint of Malate, his former parish. The beautiful, shoulder-borne carriage on which the image was mounted was commissioned by Doña Jacinta vda. De Tayag of Bacolor.

The crusade officially started on May 1, 1952, or four years after the birth of the diocese, in the San Miguel Arcangel Parish on Masantol, the southernmost town of Pampanga. Throughout the year well-attended processions marked the transfer of the image from parish to parish.

Part of the tradition of the crusade was the donation of all alms and goods collected from the previously visited parish to the next parish. Soon, the processions of the Virgen de los Remedios featured truckloads of material goods being distributed to the indigent residents; thus, Kapampangan learned to share their processions and the visits of the Virgen became joyous occasions of replenishing both body and spirit.

When all the parishes had been visited by the image of the Virgen, it was the turn of Baliti, its home parish. The people of Baliti sorely missed their beloved Virgin and celebrated their fiesta earlier without the image. When the time came for the crusade's second round of provincial visits, Bishop Guerrero, who had arrived in Baliti to pick up the image, was politely told by Baliti's parish priest, Fr. Generoso Pallasingui, that his parishioners would not the allow the image to leave the parish again. Msgr. Jose de la Cruz, now 92, who was present in the meeting, said in a recent interview that Fr. Pallasigui was quite worried that “blood would flow” if Bishop Guerrero insisted on taking the image away. (Apparently the people and their officials had made their feelings clear to the priest earlier.)

The people of Baliti graciously lent the image of their parish patroness for the first year of provincial processions. However, when it wasn't returned in time for their barrio fiesta, and when talk circulated that the image did not belong to them anymore but to the entire province, their mood turned from gracious, to sour, to indignation.

Msgr. De la Cruz, then the director of the Kapampangan radio program Ing Siuala nang Maria (The Voice of Mary), recalls that the bishop decided right then and there to have a replica image. “Considering that Baliti was Huk-infested at that time,” Msgr. De la Cruz said, “the bishop thought it wise to let the matter rest. Besides, the Cruzada was intended to bring the people closer to God, not away from Him.” He said the people may have reacted to an earlier comment he had made on the program that “no single parish owns the Virgen de los Remedios. Every parish that the image visits owns it in the duration of the visit". The comment is canonically sound because all church edifices and all artifacts found inside are technically the property of the diocese, and thus, the image is also considered property owned by the diocese and not by the Crusade.

Road to the coronation 

The first replica was thus hastily made by the late Victoriano Siongco of the Catholic Trade Center of San Fernando. It was so well made that when the processions began for the crusade's year two in late 1953, the people did not realize it was a different image. Bishop Guerrero next decided to apply to the Vatican for permission to have the image canonically crowned.

The criteria for a canonical coronation of a religious image are: (a) there must be widespread devotion around the image; and (b) the image must have proven antiquity. It was the second criterion that made Msgr. De la Cruz pause. Which of the two images should be canonically crowned, the antique Baliti image or the new replica to which popular devotion had now been transferred? Bishop Guerrero told the priest, “Just pray, Pepe.”

On the September 8, 1956, more than 70,000 Kapampangans witnessed the canonical coronation of the replica, performed by the Pope's emissary to the Philippines, Msgr. Egidio Vagnozzi, held on capitol grounds in San Fernando.

After that, the popular devotion around the crowned image of the Virgen de los Remedios grew even more. Towns that were visited often kept the image way beyond the allotted period, which slowed down the itinerary. It took 10 years or more before the image returned to the same town, which was why people pulled all stops whenever the image finally did come back to their town.

It was also around this time that the image of Santo Cristo del Perdon (Crucified Christ, Lord of Pardon) was added to accompany the Virgen. There was discussion about which image should come first during the procession, until it was decided to put the Santo Cristo del Perdon first, not only to emphasize that Christ should be first (despite the popular belief that the more important should be last) but also since Cruzada is based on penance; the first image that the people should see must be that of suffering.

In 1978 or 1979, San Fernando Archbishop Oscar V. Cruz wanted to solve the problem of the extremely slow pace of the Virgen's provincial rounds. There was a proposal to have nine new images made so that each of the diocese's nine vicariates (cluster of parishes based on geography) would have its own Virgen. Msgr. De la Cruz informed Archbishop Cruz that “It was not the intention of Bishop Guerrero to have multiple images going around.” So the compromise was reached that only two images should go around, one for the northern towns of Pampanga, and one for the southern towns. But then again, the bishop anticipated debate on which group of towns would get the canonically crowned image and which would get the new one. So he solemnly decided to have two new replicas made for the crusade in the north and the south, while the canonically crowned image would stay in the chancery (Bishop's residence) and would come out only every September 8 for the reenactment of the canonical coronation. (Many Kapampangans today erroneously call the annual event “canonical coronation”, but the Virgen was canonically crowned only once, September 8, 1956; the succeeding September 8 events are all merely anniversaries or reenactments of that first and only canonical coronation.)

The two new images were introduced during the 1981 reenactment, held in Minalin. (Reenactments were held in whichever town the Virgen was visiting around the time of the anniversary; however, when flooding worsened after the eruption of Mount Pinatubo, especially in the southern towns, the archdiocese decided to hold the reenactment alternately between San Fernando and Angeles, simply because they are the only towns with enough facilities to accommodate the big crowds and because they are relatively dry during the monsoon season.)

See also
Roman Catholicism in the Philippines
List of Catholic dioceses in the Philippines

References

Archdiocesan website
www.catholic-hierarchy.org

Roman Catholic dioceses in the Philippines
Archdiocese
Christian organizations established in 1948
Roman Catholic dioceses and prelatures established in the 20th century
1948 establishments in the Philippines
San Fernando, Pampanga
Religion in Pampanga